Chres Laursen, better known mononymously as Chres and by his previous in-game name Sencux, is a Danish professional League of Legends player. He is the mid laner for AGO Rogue of the Ultraliga, the top-level league for professional League of Legends players in Poland. Chres previously played for LCL team Gambit Esports, and EU LCS teams Splyce and Misfits Gaming.

Career 

Sencux was considered an up-and-coming talent prior to his EU LCS debut, but had to wait a year before he met the league's age requirement. He joined Splyce after Team Dignitas EU was purchased by Follow eSports for over $1 mil USD. Splyce finished 7th in the 2016 Spring EU LCS and survive relegation by winning the promotion match.

Tournament results

Team Dignitas EU 
 1st — 2015 EU CS Summer Playoffs

Splyce 
 2nd — 2016 EU LCS Summer regular season

References 

Danish esports players
Splyce players
SK Gaming players
Dignitas (esports) players
Living people
League of Legends mid lane players
Year of birth missing (living people)